2016 North American League of Legends Championship Series was played in two splits:

 2016 Spring North American League of Legends Championship Series
 2016 Summer North American League of Legends Championship Series